Lee Joon-woo is a South Korean actor and model. He is best known for his roles in dramas such as School 2017, Dokgo Rewind, Sweet Home, and Rookie Cops.

Biography
He was born in Busan on June 23, 1992. He went to Seoul at the age of 18 and his parents transferred to Seoul. He attended high school and college to study acting. After he graduated from college, he majored in acting and signed with Walnut & U Entertainment. He made his debut as an actor in 2013. The same year, he appeared in drama The Heirs. In 2017, he appeared in the drama School 2017. The next year, he appeared in the drama Dokgo Rewind. In 2020, he appeared in the drama Sweet Home as Ryu Jae-hwan.

Filmography

Television series

References

External links
 
 

1992 births
Living people
21st-century South Korean male actors
South Korean male models
South Korean male television actors